Roman Ivanovich Khudyakov (born 28 January 1977 in Tiraspol, Moldavian Soviet Socialist Republic, Soviet Union) is a Transnistrian-born Russian politician. On 1 August 2006 he was elected chairman of the Liberal Democratic Party of Pridnestrovie at the party's founding congress.

In 2011 he was a candidate to State Duma of Russia but lost the elections. On 16 May 2012 the Liberal Democratic Party of Russia decided to hand over to him a deputy mandate that became available after Aleksey Ostrovskiy received his position of Smolensk Oblast governor. In 2016 he was expelled from the Liberal Democratic Party of Russia and the Liberal Democratic Party of Pridnestrovie. He later sought re-election with the Rodina party but lost to United Russia candidate Alexander Zhupikov.

Gagauzia referendum
On 2 February 2014, Gagauzia held a referendum where an overwhelming majority of voters opted for closer ties with Russia over EU integration and also opted for the independence of Gagauzia if Moldova chooses to enter EU. Khudyakov attended the referendum as an observer.

2018 presidential campaign
On 21 December 2017, at the Convention of the party Chestno (Honestly), Roman Khudyakov was nominated as a presidential candidate for the 2018 election. On the same day Khudyakov submitted documents to the CEC for official registration as a presidential candidate. Since Khudyakov was nominated by the non-parliamentary party, he had to collect 100,000 signatures in his support to register.

On 22 January 2018, Roman Khudyakov handed the collected signatures to the CEC, but immediately announced the withdrawal of his candidacy from the election and the support of the incumbent President Vladimir Putin.

Controversy

On 8 July 2014 Khudyakov declared that the image of Apollo driving Quadriga on the portico of the Bolshoi Theatre in Moscow on the 100-ruble banknote constitutes as pornography because the image shows Apollo's genitals and should only be available to people older than 18 years of age. Since it is impractical to limit the access of minors to banknotes, he requested in his letter to the Governor of the Bank of Russia Elvira Nabiullina to urgently change the design of the banknote. He was ignored and, recently printed 100-ruble notes sport the same image.

References

External links
Tiraspol Times: "In PMR, Zhirinovsky followers form new political party"

1977 births
Living people
People from Tiraspol
Liberal Democratic Party of Russia politicians
Liberal Democratic Party of Pridnestrovie politicians
Rodina (political party) politicians
Sixth convocation members of the State Duma (Russian Federation)